Robert Clinton Maxson (born May 8, 1936) is an American academic administrator who has served as president of several institutions of higher education.  He was most recently (2008–10) president of Sierra Nevada College, a private, liberal arts college in Incline Village, Nevada.

Much of his previous leadership work was in public, urban universities in the western United States.  He was president of the University of Houston–Victoria from 1978 to 1982, president of the University of Nevada, Las Vegas from 1984 to 1994 and president of California State University, Long Beach, from June 1994 until January 2006. He was succeeded there by F. King Alexander. Maxson was ultimately president of Sierra Nevada College from 2007 to 2010, until he retired.

He has been named President of the Year four consecutive years by student leaders of the 23-campus California State University system; after the fourth year the award was permanently named after him. as well as Man of the Year by the National Conference for Community and Justice and by the American Jewish Committee.

References

Living people
Presidents of the University of Houston–Victoria
Presidents of the University of Nevada, Las Vegas
Presidents of California State University, Long Beach
Sierra Nevada College
1936 births